is a passenger railway station located in the city of Wakayama, Wakayama Prefecture, Japan, operated by the private railway company Nankai Electric Railway.

Lines
Nirigahama Station is served by the Kada Line, and has the station number "NK44-5"., It is located 6.2 kilometers from the terminus of the line at Kinokawa Station and 8.9 kilometers from Wakayamashi Station.

Station layout
The station consists of two opposed side platforms connected by a level crossing.

Platforms

Adjacent stations

History
Nirigahama Station opened on June 16, 1912.

Passenger statistics
In fiscal 2019, the station was used by an average of 396 passengers daily (boarding passengers only).

Surrounding Area
 Nishiwaki Elementary School

See also
List of railway stations in Japan

References

External links

 Nirigahama Station Official Site

Railway stations in Japan opened in 1912
Railway stations in Wakayama Prefecture
Wakayama (city)